Edward Francis McCartan (August 16, 1879 – September 20, 1947) was an American sculptor, best known for his decorative bronzes done in an elegant style popular in the 1920s.

Life
Born in Albany, New York, he studied at the Pratt Institute, with Herbert Adams. He also studied at the Art Students League of New York  with George Grey Barnard and Hermon Atkins MacNeil, and then in Paris for three years under Jean Antoine Injalbert before his return to the United States in 1910.

In 1914, McCartan became the Director of the sculpture department of the Beaux-Arts Institute of Design in New York City.  Eleanor Mary Mellon was among those he taught during his career.

Posthumously honored by the National Sculpture Society, his public monuments were few—but the Eugene Field Memorial ("Winken, Blinken, and Nod") can still be found in the Lincoln Park Zoo, Chicago.

McCartan's sculpture, The Nude, was stolen from the Grosse Pointe War Memorial in Michigan and was discovered at the bottom of the Detroit River eight years later.

McCartan sculpted the 19th issue of the Society of Medalists, Peace in the New World/War in the Old World. Other work can be found at Brookgreen Gardens in South Carolina. New Jersey Bell Headquarters Building, a national historic site in Newark, New Jersey includes pilasters by the artist. He worked on a pediment for the Department of Labor Building, in 1934 to 1935. His work was also part of the sculpture event in the art competition at the 1932 Summer Olympics.

He died in New Rochelle, New York, September 20, 1947 and is buried at St. Agnes Cemetery, Menands, New York.

Works
Girl Drinking from a Shell, c. 1915 Reading Public Museum
Nymph and Satyr, 1920, The Century Association
Boy and Panther, 1920
Dream Lady, Eugene Field Memorial 1922, Lincoln Park
Diana, 1923, Metropolitan Museum of Art
Diana and Hound, 1923, High Museum of Art
Dionysus (McCartan) 1923 remodeled 1936 Brookgreen Gardens
Diana and Doe 1924
Bather, 1935, Pennsylvania Academy of the Fine Arts
Nymph and Frog, 1938

References

External links

1879 births
1947 deaths
Artists from Albany, New York
American architectural sculptors
American male sculptors
Art Students League of New York alumni
Burials at St. Agnes Cemetery
20th-century American sculptors
20th-century American male artists
National Sculpture Society members
Sculptors from New York (state)
Olympic competitors in art competitions